Muhamed Hasa (born 10 September 2001) is an Albanian-born Italian rugby union player, currently playing for Italian United Rugby Championship side Zebre Parma. His preferred position is prop.

In 2020 and 2021 Hasa was named in Italy U20s squad for annual Six Nations Under 20s Championship. On 26 May 2022, for the match against Netherlands, he was named in the 30-man Emerging Italy squad,  for the 2022 July rugby union tests.

References

External links
itsrugby.co.uk Profile

Living people
Italian rugby union players
Petrarca Rugby players
Zebre Parma players
Rugby union props
2001 births
Sportspeople from Tirana